Heartland bandavirus, sometimes called Heartland virus (HRTV), is a tick-borne phlebovirus of the Bhanja virus serocomplex discovered in 2009. The lone star tick transmits the virus to people when feeding on blood. As of 2017, only five states in the Central United States have reported 20 human infections, namely Arkansas, Indiana, Missouri, Oklahoma, and Tennessee; symptoms resemble those of two other tick-borne infections ehrlichiosis and anaplasmosis. The reservoir host is unknown, but deer, raccoon, coyotes, and moose in 13 different states have antibody titers against the virus. By 2023 over 50 human infections were reported in at least eleven states.

History
The Heartland virus (HRTV) was discovered in 2009 in northwestern Missouri by Dr. Scott Folk of Heartland Regional Medical Center in St. Joseph, Missouri.
The Lone Star Tick transmits the virus to people when feeding on blood.

Classification
The Heartland virus is part of the Bunyavirales order of viruses which contain 3 segments of −ssRNA. The genus of the virus is Phlebovirus and the species is the Heartland virus.

Transmission
In 2013, researchers from the CDC and Missouri Western State University first isolated the Heartland virus (HRTV) from the Lone Star Tick (Amblyomma americanum).  
As of 2013 work continued to identify the reservoir host, as HRTV has not been isolated from any wild or domestic animals though many white-tailed deer and raccoon from northwestern Missouri had antibodies to HRTV, suggesting that they may be hosts.

In a 2015 retrospective study using convenience samples of different wild animal sera deer, raccoon, coyotes, and moose had antibodies against HRTV. They lived in thirteen states: Florida, Georgia, Illinois, Indiana, Kansas, Kentucky, Missouri, North Carolina, Tennessee, Texas, but also New Hampshire, Maine and Vermont. The infections could have occurred as early as 2003, based on the estimated ages of affected deer. Since the Lone Star tick does not occur in northern New England it is assumed that a second type of tick can carry HRTV.

Infection

Signs and symptoms
Signs and symptoms include fever in excess of 100.4 °F (38 °C), lethargy (weakness), headaches, muscle pain (myalgia), loss of appetite, nausea, diarrhea, weight loss, joint pain (arthralgia), low white blood cell count (leukopenia) and easy bruising due to a low platelet count (thrombocytopenia). Elevated liver transaminases may also be present.

Risk factors
All known human cases have been reported from five U.S. states: Arkansas, Indiana, Missouri, Oklahoma, and Tennessee. Most people infected were spending time outdoors in regions where ticks are endemic. Most infections are diagnosed between May and September. People usually report having been bitten by a tick within two weeks prior to seeking health care.

Diagnosis
Diagnosis is through the elimination of other causes of infectious diseases with related symptoms like ehrlichiosis and anaplasmosis or if the patient fails to respond to treatment with the antibiotic doxycycline. RT-PCR may then be used to detect viral ssRNA in the blood. Antibody titers against the virus may also be used to indicate infection with the Heartland virus.

Treatment
Treatment is non-specific. Antibiotics are not useful against viruses.  Intravenous fluid administration and medications for the relief of pain are currently the best options.

Prevention
When planning to spend time outdoors in areas where the virus is known or suspected to be harbored by ticks, it is recommended that one cover the body completely with long sleeves and pants, and to avoid bushy and wooded areas. Although ticks are not consistently repelled by DEET-containing repellents, insect repellents should still be applied to one's body and gear. It is recommended that one perform thorough tick checks after being outside, and to remove any tick immediately. If a tick is found, one should remove the tick by the head, preferably with a pair of fine-tipped tweezers. Squeezing the abdomen of a tick while it is attached can force viruses and bacteria into the wound, increasing the chance of infection. Crushing an unattached tick will also release bacteria and viruses from its abdomen, which may then be able to enter a wound or burrow through the skin.

Human cases
More than 20 human infections have been reported in the United States, but given the obscurity of the disease, the true number of cases is suspected to be substantially larger.

References

Phleboviruses
Tick-borne diseases
Unaccepted virus taxa